The Former Mattia Pascal (Italian: Il fu Mattia Pascal) is a 1937 Italian drama film directed by Pierre Chenal and starring Pierre Blanchar, Isa Miranda and Irma Gramatica. It is based on the 1904 novel Il fu Mattia Pascal by Luigi Pirandello. The film was shot at the Cines Studios in Rome. A separate French-language version was also made, under the title The Man from Nowhere.

The film's art direction was by Guido Fiorini.

Cast
 Pierre Blanchar as Mattia Pascal  
 Isa Miranda as Luisa Paleari  
 Irma Gramatica as La vedova Pescatore  
 Nella Maria Bonora as Romilda Pescatore Pascal 
 Olga Solbelli as Silvia Caporale  
 Enrico Glori as Il conte Papiano  
 Adele Garavaglia as Angelica Bonafede Pascal  
 Silvio Bagolini as Il portiere dell'hotel Luxor  
 Pina Gallini as Zia Scolastica  
 Luigi Pralavorio as Pomino  
 Giuseppe Pierozzi as Il bibliotecario anziano  
 Luigi Zerbinati as L'idiota della pensione 
 Cesare Zoppetti as Paleari 
 Alberto Angelini 
 Guido Barbarisi 
 Ornella Da Vasto 
 Fernando De Crucciati 
 Nino Eller 
 Claudio Ermelli as Il becchino  
 Enzo Gainotti 
 Mario Gallina 
 Luisa Garella 
 Fausto Guerzoni as Un cameriere  
 Rita Livesi 
 Achille Majeroni 
 Nicola Maldacea 
 Cesare Polacco as Un ospite della pensione  
 Giovanna Scotto 
 Edda Soligo as Una signora al tavolo da giocco 
 Gino Viotti

References

Bibliography
 Landy, Marcia. Fascism in Film: The Italian Commercial Cinema, 1931-1943. Princeton University Press, 2014.

External links

1937 films
1937 drama films
Italian drama films
1930s Italian-language films
Films based on works by Luigi Pirandello
Films based on Italian novels
Films directed by Pierre Chenal
Italian multilingual films
Cines Studios films
Italian black-and-white films
1937 multilingual films
1930s Italian films